Hallam Cole (1 June 1874 – 15 March 1932) was a Barbadian cricketer. He played in twenty-two first-class matches for the Barbados cricket team from 1894 to 1908.

See also
 List of Barbadian representative cricketers

References

External links
 

1874 births
1932 deaths
Barbadian cricketers
Barbados cricketers
People from Saint Michael, Barbados